Cephalops perkinsiellae is a species of fly in the family Pipunculidae.

Distribution
Hawaii

References

Pipunculidae
Insects described in 1953
Endemic fauna of Hawaii
Diptera of Asia
Taxa named by D. Elmo Hardy